The Ukrainian Catholic Archiepiscopal Exarchate of Donetsk is one of the Ukrainian Greek Catholic Church (Byzantine Rite, Ukrainian language)'s five Archiepiscopal Exarchate (Eastern Catholic pre-diocesan missionary jurisdiction under a Major Archbishop) in Eastern Ukraine.

Its cathedral episcopal see is the Cathedral of the Virgin of Mercy, in Donetsk. There is a Basilian monastery at Zvanivka, in the north of Donetsk Oblast.

The current, and first, archiepiscopal exarch is Bishop Stepan Meniok, C.Ss.R.

History 
It was established on 11 January 2002 as the Archiepiscopal Exarchate of Donets’k – Kharkiv, on territory split off from the then Archiepiscopal Exarchate of Kyiv – Vyshhorod (which became the Ukrainian Catholic Archeparchy of Kyiv).

On 2 April 2014 the Exarchate was renamed as Ukrainian Catholic Archiepiscopal Exarchate of Donetsk, having lost territory to establish the Ukrainian Catholic Archiepiscopal Exarchate of Kharkiv.

Episcopal ordinaries 
Archiepiscopal Exarch of Donetsk–Kharkiv 
 Stepan Meniok, C.SS.R. (2002.01.11 – 2014.04.02 'see below), Titular Bishop of Acarassus (2002.01.11 – ...)
 Auxiliary Bishop Wasyl Ihor Medwit, O.S.B.M. (2009.03.17 – 2013.10.25), emeritus; previously Auxiliary Bishop of Lviv of the Ukrainians (Ukraine) (1994.03.30 – 1996.09.30), Titular Bishop of Hadriane (1994.03.30 – ...), Apostolic Visitor in Kazakhstan and Central Asia of the Ukrainians (1996.09.30 – 2002.10), Archiepiscopal Exarch of Kyiv–Vyshhorod of the Ukrainians (Ukraine) (1997.09.20 – 2004.12.06), Bishop of Curia of the Ukrainians (2004.12.06 – 2009.03.17)

Archiepiscopal Exarchs of Donetsk
 Stephan Meniok, C.SS.R. (see above 2014.04.02 – ...)

Sources and external links 
  GCatholic.org with incumbent biography links
 Profile at catholic-hierarchy.org

Ukrainian Greek Catholic Church
Donetsk
Culture in Donetsk